Chris Jones (born 1972) is a former American football wide receiver who played one season with the Hamilton Tiger-Cats of the Canadian Football League (CFL). He played college football at Mississippi State University.

College career
Jones played for the Mississippi State Bulldogs from 1993 to 1995, recording 1,199 receiving yards and five touchdowns on 62 receptions.

Professional career
Jones played in, and started, one game for the CFL's Hamilton Tiger-Cats in 1996.

Coaching career
Jones is the head coach of the boys' track and field team and an assistant coach for the football team at Southwind High School in Memphis, Tennessee. He was previously an assistant coach for boys' track and field team at Southwind.

References

External links
 Just Sports Stats
 College stats

Living people
1972 births
American football wide receivers
Canadian football wide receivers
Hamilton Tiger-Cats players
Mississippi State Bulldogs football players
High school football coaches in Tennessee
African-American players of American football
African-American players of Canadian football
21st-century African-American sportspeople
20th-century African-American sportspeople